Nazipur Government College is a public college in Nazipur Naogaon, Bangladesh. It offers the Higher Secondary Certificate (HSC).

History

Library
The Library of Nazipur Government College was established in 1980, the same year the library was established. There are around 30,000 books, very well furnished alphabetically.

Faculties

HSC
 Science 
 Humanities
 Business Studies

Degree (Pass) :
 B.A 
 B.S.S 
 B.B.S 
 BSc

Honors :
 Islamic History & culture

Student residences
There is currently one residential hall:
 Nazipur College Hostel

See also
 Chalkmuli High School
 Chalkmomin Government Primary School
 Naogaon Zilla School

References 

Universities and colleges in Naogaon District
Colleges in Naogaon District
Educational institutions established in 1979